Yoel Strick (born 1966) is an Israeli General (Aluf) who commands the Ground Forces Command.

Military service
Strick began his military service in the Israel Defense Forces in 1985, as a cadet in the Israel Air Force (IAF) Flight School. He did not complete his pilot training, and transferred to the Paratroopers Brigade. He served as a soldier and a squad leader. He became an infantry officer after completing Officer Candidate School and return to the Paratroopers Brigade as a platoon leader. Afterwards, he transferred to Givati Brigade, and served as a company commander. During his career Strick led the Brigade's Anti-tank company in counter-guerrilla operations in South Lebanon. Afterwards, he commanded a battalion in Givati, the Battalion of the IDF Infantry Officers' School, the 5th Infantry Brigade, and the Regional Brigade in the Gaza division counter-terror operations in the Second Intifada.

In 2005 he was given command of the Givati Brigade, and he led its forces during 2006 Lebanon War. Afterwards, he commanded the 80th Division, 91st Division and the Operations Division of the IDF's Operations Directorate. In 2015 he was appointed head of the Home Front Command. In 2017 Strick was appointed head of the Northern Command, and commanded Operation Northern Shield.

External links 
 Ron Ben-Yishai, Israel will win any conflict against enemies to the north, says departing IDF commander, Ynetnews, April 18, 2019

References

1966 births
Israeli generals
Living people
Israeli military personnel
People from Dimona
Israeli people of Moroccan-Jewish descent